Amphritea is a bacteria genus from the family of Oceanospirillaceae.

References

Oceanospirillales
Bacteria genera